Dhirubhai Ambani Institute of Information and Communication Technology (DA-IICT), is a private Self-financed University/Institute located in Gandhinagar, Gujarat, India.  It is named after the Gujarati entrepreneur and Reliance group founder Dhirubhai Ambani. It is run by the Dhirubhai Ambani Foundation and is promoted by the Anil Dhirubhai Ambani Group.

Academics
DA-IICT began admitting students in August 2001, with an intake of 240 undergraduate students for its Bachelor of Technology (B.Tech.) program in Information and Communication Technology (ICT). Since then, it has expanded to include postgraduate courses such as Master of Technology (M.Tech.) in ICT, Master of Science (M.Sc.) in Information Technology, Master of Science (ICT) in Agriculture and Rural Development, Master in Design (M. Des.) and a Doctor of Philosophy (Ph.D.), a Doctorate program. The duration of the bachelor's program is 4 years. The first batch of DA-IICT post-graduates graduated in 2004 and the first batch of graduates in 2005. Fees are nominal when compared to other private institutions in India.

Admission 

Admission is based on Joint Entrance Examination - Main as well as gujrat  state exam through ACPC. A few seats are reserved for Non-Residential Indians (NRIs) and Foreign Nationals (FNs), who are admitted through the Direct Admission of Foreign Student (DAFS) channel.

Although in recent years NRI quota is now dismissed.

Student achievements 
 DAIICT has been ranked 11th in the world for student developers  among universities in year 2016. by HackerRank.
 Team of 2 students from DA-IICT won the GNLU Debate 2016 in the Novice category.
 17 students from DA-IICT selected for the prestigious Google Summer Of Code, 2013.
 Team DA-Developers represented DA-IICT at the Imagine Cup 2013 National Finals and stood third in India for Imagine Cup World Citizenship contest with their app "Read For Blind".
 Team of 4 students stood third at the National Finals for "Samsung USID Design Challenge", 2012 for their app "Location Alarm".
 17 students selected for Google Summer of Code, 2012, the highest number in India and third highest in the world.
 A student won Innovate4Women Award of the Microsoft Imagine Cup 2010 and One of its team were National Finalist in Microsoft Imagine Cup India.
 Team of 4 students won the Unlimited Potential Multipoint Education Award of the Microsoft Imagine Cup 2009, World Finals. The same team stood third in the National Finals in the Software Design category of the Microsoft Imagine Cup 2009, India Finals
 Two students won Google Women Engineering Award in year 2009 and 2010
 Two of its teams were winners at the Microsoft, High Performance Computing Scholars Program 2008
 Teams of four students each won the Microsoft Imagine cup for two consecutive years in 2006 and 2007
 Student teams won the TI DSP Design Competition in 2005, 2006 and 2007

In 2004, three MSc (IT) students of DA-IICT challenged in the Gujarat High Court, the IIMA decision to not offer admission interviews to them citing their eligibility criteria (AIU or AICTE affiliation was needed at that time). The judgement was passed in the favor of students and the CAT eligibility criteria were subsequently modified.

See also 
 Education in India
 List of universities in India
 List of institutions of higher education in India

Notes

External links 

 

Universities and colleges in Gujarat
Engineering colleges in Gujarat
Education in Gandhinagar
Reliance Group
Communications in Gujarat
2001 establishments in Gujarat
Educational institutions established in 2001